Paul Kevin Jonas II (born November 5, 1987) is an American musician, singer, songwriter, dancer, and actor. He rose to fame as a member of the pop rock band, the Jonas Brothers, alongside his younger brothers Joe and Nick. Jonas became a prominent figure on the Disney Channel alongside his brothers in the late 2000s, gaining a large following through the network: he appeared in the widely successful musical television film, Camp Rock (2008) and its sequel, Camp Rock 2: The Final Jam (2010) as well as two other series, Jonas Brothers: Living the Dream (2008–2010) and Jonas (2009–2010).

After the group confirmed a hiatus in 2012, Kevin appeared on his own E! reality series that same year, Married to Jonas, with his wife, Danielle. Following the band's initial break-up in 2013, Jonas appeared on the seventh season of The Celebrity Apprentice in 2014, founded the construction company Jonas Werner, and became the co-CEO of The Blu Market, an influencer marketing company. In 2019, he rejoined the Jonas Brothers following their reunion. The group would go on to release their fifth studio album. The reunited Jonas Brothers appeared in two Amazon Prime Video documentaries named Jonas Brothers: Chasing Happiness and Jonas Brothers: Happiness Continues in 2019 and 2020.

Jonas appeared on People magazine's list of the Sexiest Men Alive in 2008 at the age of 21, and thus included as part of the 21 Club.

Early life

Paul Kevin Jonas II was born on November 5, 1987, in Teaneck, New Jersey, and grew up in Wyckoff. His mother, Denise Marie (née Miller), is a former sign language teacher and singer, and his father, Paul Kevin Jonas Sr., is a songwriter, musician, and former ordained minister at an Assemblies of God church. He has three younger brothers, Joe (born 1989), Nick (born 1992), and Frankie (born 2000).

Career

2005–2006: Career beginnings
In early 2005, Columbia Records' new president, Steve Greenberg, listened to Nick's record. While Greenberg did not like the album, he did like Nick's voice. After hearing the song "Please Be Mine", written and performed by all the brothers, Daylight/Columbia Records decided to sign the three as a group act. After being signed to Columbia, the brothers considered naming their group "Sons of Jonas" before settling on the name "Jonas Brothers". It's About Time, the brothers' first album, was released on August 8, 2006. According to the band's manager, it was only a "limited release" of a little over 50,000 copies. Because Sony was not interested in further promoting the band, the Jonas Brothers then considered switching labels. The band was ultimately dropped by Columbia Records in early 2007.

2007–2012: Breakthrough with the Jonas Brothers
After shortly being without a label, the Jonas Brothers signed with Hollywood Records in February 2007. Around the same time, the brothers began appearing in Gap Inc. commercials for Baby Bottle Pop, singing the jingle. Their self-titled second album, Jonas Brothers, was released on August 7, 2007. It reached number five on the Billboard Hot 200 chart in its first week. Jonas and his brothers guest-starred in an episode of Hannah Montana, titled "Me and Mr. Jonas and Mr. Jonas and Mr. Jonas", which aired August 17, 2007 on Disney Channel. The episode debuted alongside the television film High School Musical 2 and a sneak peek of Phineas and Ferb. The episode broke basic cable records with a record 10.7 million viewers and became basic cable's most watched series telecast ever.

Jonas and his brothers also starred in the Disney Channel Original Movie Camp Rock, where they played a band called "Connect 3". Kevin played Jason, a guitarist; Nick played Nate, also a guitarist; and Joe played the lead male role and lead singer, Shane Gray. A soundtrack for the movie was released on June 17, 2008. The film premiered on June 20, 2008, on Disney Channel in the United States, on Disney Channel, and on Family in Canada. They returned in the sequel, Camp Rock 2: The Final Jam, which premiered on September 3, 2010. The Disney Channel reality short series, Jonas Brothers: Living the Dream, premiered on Disney Channel, May 16, 2008. The show, which ran until September 5, 2008, documented the brother's lives during the Look Me in the Eyes Tour. The name was inspired by their hit song When You Look Me in the Eyes. The series was renewed for a second season, which premiered March 21, 2010. The second season followed the band on the European leg of their World Tour 2009. The Jonas Brothers' third studio album, A Little Bit Longer, was released in the United States on August 12, 2008, and peaked at No. 1 on the Billboard 200.

Kevin, Joe, Nick, and Frankie starred in their own Disney Channel Original Series, Jonas, which premiered May 2, 2009. The show was renewed for a second season premiering June 20, 2010 as Jonas L.A. It centered on the brothers vacationing at their summer house in Los Angeles with Stella and Macy. On June 16, 2009, the brothers' fourth studio album, and third release under Hollywood Records, titled Lines, Vines, and Trying Times was released. The album peaked at number 1 on the Billboard 200 with 247,000 copies sold.

Jonas appeared on MTV's fourth episode of When I Was 17, talking about life as a teenager, regarding sports and his hairstyles. He guest hosted Live with Kelly, December 13, 2011, and did so a second time on July 4, 2012. It was announced on May 1, 2012, that the Jonas Brothers parted ways with their record label Hollywood Records, and bought the rights to their music.

2013–2018: Jonas Brothers split
Jonas appeared in an E! reality series alongside his wife, Danielle, and his brothers, which premiered on August 19, 2012. Produced by Ryan Seacrest, Married to Jonas documented the young couple's domestic life as well as the brothers' recording efforts as they prepared to release their fifth studio album. The final episode of the second season aired on May 26, 2013. On October 29, 2013, The Jonas Brothers officially announced that the band was breaking up because of creative differences.

After parting ways with the Jonas Brothers in 2013, he founded the real estate development, construction company called JonasWerner, and is the co-CEO of The Blu Market company, which deals with communications and plans for social media influencers. Jonas was part of the seventh season of Celebrity Apprentice taping in spring 2014, which was filmed throughout New York City. He was fired in the second episode when his team lost the competition, during which time he'd been acting as the team leader. Kevin also made a cameo in a 2014 episode of The Real Housewives of New Jersey, working in his new role as contractor, leading the construction on Housewife Kathy Wakile's home.

In 2015, he created a food app Yood. As of 2016, he is also in partnership with the video-sharing app We Heart It. While the band was on hiatus, Nick was on his solo music and acting career, while Joe started the band DNCE in 2015 with Jonas Brothers drummer Jack Lawless, Semi Precious Weapons bassist Cole Whittle, and guitarist JinJoo Lee.

2019–present: Jonas Brothers reunion and Happiness Begins
On February 28, 2019, nearly six years after the Jonas Brothers initial breakup, the brothers announced the band's reunion. They commenced their reunion the next day with releasing their new single, "Sucker" on March 1, 2019, and partaking in a week long segment on The Late Late Show with James Corden everyday from March 4 to March 7. Jonas and his brothers appeared in the band's documentary Chasing Happiness, which was released on June 4, 2019. On May 9, 2019, a compilation album titled Music from Chasing Happiness was released. It consists of old Jonas Brothers songs, two Nick songs, one Joe song featuring a guest appearance from Lil Wayne, and a song from Joe's band DNCE, who are currently in hiatus as of January 2019 since Joe and Jonas Brothers and DNCE drummer Jack Lawless have resumed work back with the brothers. Directed by John Lloyd Taylor, the documentary covers the brothers childhood life, how the brothers started as a band, why the band broke up, and how the band got back together.

They released their fifth studio album, Happiness Begins on June 7, 2019. It is the band's first album released after their reunion. They have released two songs with other artists, which consist of: their feature on "Runaway" by Sebastián Yatra, Daddy Yankee, and Natti Natasha, as well as their collaboration on "Lonely" with Diplo. They released a song titled "Greenlight" for their episode of Songland the same day on June 18, three days before "Runaway". On November 8, they released a Christmas song, "Like It's Christmas".

On January 17, 2020, they released a new single, "What a Man Gotta Do", the lead single for their upcoming sixth studio album.

Personal life
Kevin Jonas lives in New Jersey with his wife, Danielle Deleasa, and their two daughters.

Danielle is a former hairdresser with Ryan Rodgers Redken Ambassador, and the pair married at Oheka Castle on December 19, 2009, with his brothers Joe and Nick as his best men. The couple met while vacationing with their families in the Bahamas in May 2007. Their first daughter was born on February 2, 2014, and their second daughter was born on October 27, 2016.

In April 2021, Jonas showed support for the NGO GiveIndia during the worsening situation of the COVID-19 pandemic in India and urged fans to help donate to the organization to help.

In September 2021, Jonas and his wife Danielle announced the release of a book for children titled There's a Rock Concert in My Bedroom, which chronicles the story of Emma, a girl who is excited about participating in her school's talent show. The Jonases said the initiative was motivated by their daughters. It was released in April 2022.

Filmography

Film

Television

Web

Video games

References

External links

 

1987 births
Living people
21st-century American male actors
Male actors from New Jersey
American male film actors
American mandolinists
American pop guitarists
American male singer-songwriters
American male television actors
American male voice actors
American people of Italian descent
American people of Irish descent
American people of English descent
American people of Scottish descent
American people of German descent
American people of French-Canadian descent
Jonas Brothers members
Singer-songwriters from New Jersey
People from Teaneck, New Jersey
People from Wyckoff, New Jersey
Participants in American reality television series
Guitarists from New Jersey
Walt Disney Records artists
Columbia Records artists
Hollywood Records artists
American male guitarists
21st-century American singers
Jonas family
American people who self-identify as being of Native American descent
The Apprentice (franchise) contestants